Beyond Sport is a 501(c)(3) and UK registered global foundation that promotes the role sport can play in creating sustainable social change. Over the past 14 years, the Foundation has given out grants totaling $6.7 million, and supported over 490 projects in 150 countries. Its support has gone to a diverse range of organizations and individuals using sports ranging from yoga to martial arts to football to tackle social issues head on. It works in partnership with other organisations including NBA, ESPN, Comic Relief, Sport England, The North Face, Unilever, MLB, MLS, NHL and UK Sport. It has a global Board of Directors and Youth Advisory Board.

Return to Play Fund
Return to Play Fund is a collaborative fund in partnership between ESPN and Beyond Sport that supports Black and Brown youth and the community sports organizations that serve them across the U.S. The Fund looks to center health, wellbeing and systemic solutions to the heart of community recovery and ensure that Black and Brown youth are not further disadvantaged, supporting a range of non-profit community sport organizations across the country that are dedicated to getting young people of color playing sports and committed to providing them with guidance and opportunities to grow, succeed and be confident in their abilities. They are looking for funding partners to support and inspire Black and Brown youth who have been challenged the most by the pandemic.

Beyond Sport United
Backed by the major U.S. Leagues - MLB, MLS, NHL, NFL, NBA & WNBA - Beyond Sport United is an annual gathering of sport-led social innovators and global leaders around the role of teams and leagues in creating positive social change.

Board Members
Board of Directors:

- Jean Afterman, SVP and Assistant GM, New York Yankees

- David Becker, International Sports and Entertainment Lawyer

- His Royal Highness Prince Ali Bin Al Hussein

- Lex Chalat, Director, Community Engagement and World Cup Legacy, Qatar Foundation

- Michel de Carvalho, Chairman, Capital Generation Partners

- John Gleasure, Group Executive Vice Chairman, DAZN

- Nick Keller, Founder and President, Beyond Sport

- Sello Moloko, Executive Chair, Thesele Group 

- Kely Nascimento, Founder, Nascimento Foundation, Documentary Filmmaker

- Jin Teik OON, Managing Director disrupTEIK Consultancy, Former CEO Singapore Sports Hub

- Cameron Rogers, CFA, Private Wealth Advisor, Ellevest

Youth Advisory Board:

- Siham Abdullahi, UK

- Carolina Agurcia, Honduras 

- Tyrel Butler, Trinidad

- Nuth Chork, Cambodia

- Andrea Golli, US

- Laiba Masoud, Pakistan

- Daniel Ocenar, Philippines

- Ferdnand Wakalile, Uganda

References

External links 
 Beyond Sport website

Sports organisations of the United Kingdom
Organisations based in London
Charity fundraisers
Sports charities